Kiangara  is a town in Analamanga Region, in the  Central Highlands of Madagascar, in the district of Ankazobe. It is located north-west from the capital of Antananarivo. It has a population of 18,197 inhabitants in 2018.

References

Populated places in Analamanga